Priya Dutt Roncon (born 28 August 1966) is an Indian politician and social worker. She was elected for the first time to the 14th Lok Sabha from Mumbai North West constituency in Maharashtra on 22 November 2005, representing the Indian National Congress party. She represented the Mumbai North Central constituency in the 15th Lok Sabha from 2009. In the 2014 and 2019 Indian general elections, she was defeated by Poonam Mahajan of the BJP.

Early life and education
Priya Dutt Roncon, born as Priya Balraj Dutt is the daughter of the Bollywood actor and politician Sunil Dutt and Nargis Dutt. She is of Punjabi descent and was born and raised in Bombay, Maharashtra. Her parents were elected to represent the Indian National Congress and her father was a government minister. She is the sister of actor Sanjay Dutt and Namrata Dutt. With her sister, she published a memoir, Mr and Mrs Dutt: Memories of our Parents, in 2007.

She received her Bachelor of Arts degree in Sociology from Sophia College, University of Bombay in Cumbala Hill, South Bombay. She has a Post Graduate Diploma in television production from the Center for Media Arts in New York City, New York State, United States.

Politics
It first became obvious that Priya was her father’s successor when she accompanied him on his Mahashanti Padyatra in 1987 from Mumbai to Amritsar. In 2005, following the death of her father, Sunil Dutt, and despite a low voter turnout, she won her seat in the Lok Sabha by a margin of 172,043 votes over the Shiv Sena candidate. Dutt received considerable media attention for this victory, partially on account of her famous family.

Since her election, Priya has been appointed secretary of the All-India Congress Committee. In the 2014 and 2019 Indian general elections, she was defeated by Poonam Mahajan of the BJP.

Other activities
After university, Dutt worked in television and video and studied at The Center for the Media Arts in New York. During and after the Bombay riots, Dutt worked with Muslim refugees in Mumbai. She reported receiving threatening telephone calls and public harassment.

Dutt also founded the Nargis Dutt Memorial Charitable Trust (NDMCT), which was started by her father Sunil Dutt, in memory of her mother Nargis Dutt who died from cancer in 1981.

Personal life
Priya married Owen Roncon on 27 November 2003. Roncon is a partner in Oranjuice Entertainment, a music promotion company, and Fountainhead Promotions & Events Pvt Ltd, a marketing firm. Roncon is a Roman Catholic from Bandra, West Mumbai. They have two sons Sumair (born 2007) and Siddharth (born 2005).

Bibliography
 Mr and Mrs Dutt: Memories of our Parents, Namrata Dutt Kumar and Priya Dutt, 2007, Roli Books. .

References

External links

Official website
Nargis: A daughter remembers, by Priya Dutt

1966 births
Living people
Women in Maharashtra politics
India MPs 2004–2009
India MPs 2009–2014
Punjabi people
Sophia College for Women alumni
Politicians from Mumbai
Indian National Congress politicians from Maharashtra
Lok Sabha members from Maharashtra
United Progressive Alliance candidates in the 2014 Indian general election
21st-century Indian women politicians
21st-century Indian politicians